Slivovo is a small village in the municipality of Debarca, North Macedonia. It used to be part of the former municipality of Belčišta.

Demographics
According to the census of 2002, the village has a population of 16, all Macedonians.

References 

Villages in Debarca Municipality